The 2012 Guatemala earthquake occurred on November 7 at . The shock had a moment magnitude of 7.4 and a maximum Mercalli Intensity of VII (Very strong). The region is one of many earthquakes, where the Cocos Plate is being subducted along the Middle America Trench beneath the North American and the Caribbean Plates, near their triple junction.

The quake was reportedly felt in Guatemala and in parts of Mexico, El Salvador, Belize, Honduras, Nicaragua and Costa Rica. Damage to buildings was reported in several cities in Guatemala, including San Marcos, Quetzaltenango and the capital Guatemala City. The Pacific Tsunami Warning Center issued a warning about the possibility of a local tsunami within  of the epicenter.

With 48 dead, this is the most intense and deadliest earthquake that has hit Guatemala since the earthquake of 1976.

Damage and casualties by country

Guatemala
San Marcos, Quetzaltenango, Sololá, Totonicapán, Quiché and Huehuetenango were the hardest hit departments. Preliminary reports mention a death toll of at least 42 in Guatemala, of which 29 in San Marcos, 11 in Quetzaltenango, and 2 in Sololá. According to the minister of energy of Guatemala, the earthquake left 73,000 households without power. The Guatemalan president initially declared a 30-day "state of calamity" in the departments of Retalhuleu, Sololá, Totonicapán, San Marcos, Quetzaltenango, Quiché and Huehuetenango. The "state of calamity" was subsequently prolonged until being revoked on July 25, 2013. In Guatemala, as of November 11, 9,414 houses were found damaged, and 18,755 people were evacuated, 7,218 of which stayed in 61 refuges. The Pan-American Highway in Guatemala (CA-1) was damaged.

 

There were collapsed buildings and reported deaths and injuries in San Marcos. Accounts of deaths and injuries in San Marcos were initially difficult to confirm due to communication interruption and roads blocked by landslides. Many people in San Marcos, fearing possible aftershocks, gathered on the cold and dark streets. At least 50 houses were damaged in El Quetzal, 9 of which no longer inhabitable, and the dwellers had to take refuge in the community public school. More than 300 people stayed in 10 refuges in the department. Lack of water in the refuges in San Pedro Sacatepéquez and San Marcos due to the collapse of piping caused preoccupations about the sanitary conditions.

Eight people were buried in a landslide in Concepción Chiquirichapa. Ten deaths were reported in Quetzaltenango department. 156 houses were damaged in Quetzaltenango Department, and government buildings in Quetzaltenango City (Xela) were slightly damaged.

Retalhuleu, situated in the south, is close to the epicenter. The Departmental Palace of Retalhuleu, a historical building, was damaged, which caused the government offices therein to be relocated.

Sololá reported the most damaged houses with number of 4,756, followed by 3,870 in San Marcos.

Cracks were reported in Palacio Nacional de la Cultura in Guatemala City, a former government seat built between 1939 and 1943.

Some houses of the coffee growers were damaged. No major damage was reported for agricultural products such as coffee, vegetables and potatoes.

Mexico
Minor damage was reported in the state of Chiapas, which neighbors Guatemala. In Chiapas, public buildings were evacuated, and telephone and internet services were interrupted. Over a dozen of buildings in Chiapas had minor fissures; the city hall of Tapachula, the installations of the Desarrollo Integral de la Familia, along with a school in Ciudad Hidalgo, were among the places affected.

In the state of Oaxaca, several aftershocks of the earthquake were felt throughout various communities. The quake was also felt in the states of Campeche, Guerrero, Michoacán, Morelos, Puebla and Tabasco.

In Mexico City, workers rushed to the streets from the office buildings, and no major damage was reported.

El Salvador
In El Salvador, many urban dwellers evacuated their homes in the capital city, but there were no reports of any damage.

Nicaragua
Nicaragua emitted a tsunami alert after the quake and alerted several communities along the coastlines to mobilize to higher altitudes.

Relief and reconstruction 

The minister of finance of Guatemala expressed that 800 million quetzales were ready for covering emergent needs due to the earthquake. The Ministry of Health of Guatemala assigned 1 million quetzales to the hospital of San Marcos and dispatched two trucks with medicines. In Guatemala City, various organizations collected donated provisions for people affected by the earthquake. The minister of interior announced a fund of 25 million quetzales for the reconstruction of damaged police stations, prisons, and government buildings.

The United States Ambassador to Guatemala announced to offer 50,000 USD to Coordinadora Nacional para la Reducción de Desastres (CONRED) for immediate humanitarian help. The United States and Taiwan would offer 110,000 USD in total as economical support. The Inter-American Development Bank would offer 200,000 USD. Various countries offered to provide help in personnel or matter, including Venezuela and Chile. World Food Programme offered 72 tonnes of emergency food aid.

On November 9, the authorities started the evaluation of the damaged houses in San Marcos and San Pedro Sacatepéquez to decide which to be repaired and which to be demolished and rebuilt. The reconstruction in San Marcos had started on November 27. It was estimated that the reconstruction of the houses could need at least a year.

See also 

List of earthquakes in 2012
List of earthquakes in Guatemala

References

External links

Guatemala earthquake
2012 in Guatemala
Earthquakes in Guatemala
November 2012 events in South America